"Homecoming Queen" is a single by American rock band Hinder from their debut studio album Extreme Behavior (2005).

The song bears a strong resemblance to "Sweet Child o' Mine" by Guns N' Roses.

Chart performance
The song peaked at number 16 on Billboard's Mainstream Rock chart, and also debuted at #100 on the Canadian Hot 100.

Charts

Release history

References 

2005 songs
2007 singles
Hinder songs
Songs about drugs
Songs written by Brian Howes
Universal Republic Records singles
Songs written by Cody Hanson
Songs written by Austin John Winkler